York Cemetery or York Qabristan is an Anglo-Indian cemetery located in New Delhi, India.

Notable interments
 Anthony de Mello, cricket administrator and one of the founders of the Board of Control for Cricket in India.
 K R Narayanan, President of India (1997 – 2002)

External links
 

Anglo-Indian people
New Delhi
Cemeteries in India